The Parish School is a private, non-profit school located in Houston, Texas, United States. It is adjacent to the Spring Branch district.

The independent school serves children from developmentally 18 months to 12 years (or the fifth grade) who have average or above learning potential, but whose language, learning or communication differences impact their ability to be successful in a mainstream academic setting.

The Parish School is located outside of Beltway 8 and north of Interstate 10 in West Houston.

The school is a part of the Houston Area Independent Schools.

History
The Parish School was established in 1983 by Robbin Parish, M.A., CCC-SLP, a speech language pathologist. The school initially had six students. As its founder, Parish sought to create an environment where students with average or above cognitive skills, could receive therapeutic intervention to support their learning. The intent was to assist the student and his or her family to learn how the child learns best (visually, kinesthetically or auditorily), and to then use that strength to assist the child in their areas of focus.

Originally the school was located at a small lot at 11059 Timberline, but the school moved into a new  campus at 11001 Hammerly in the Fall of 2005. The former site of The Parish School is, as of 2007, occupied by The Rainard School; Rainard moved from its Old Katy Road campus to the Timberline address after The Parish School moved to 11001 Hammerly.

The school planned for Parish's retirement party to occur on Saturday June 19, 2010. Parish died on Saturday June 12, 2010. The school opted to continue with its scheduled plans for the retirement party.

As of 2010 the school had 150 students, from 18 months to 12 years of age.

In January 2011 the University of Texas Medical School at Houston Children's Learning Institute began sending resident neurologists and pediatricians to The Parish School, making it a part of their training rotations.

The school is home to the Adventure Playground at the Parish School, one of the few permanent Adventure playgrounds in the United States.

On February 2, 2011 the school celebrated its first "Founder's Day" as a memorial to Parish.

In June 2011 Nancy Bewley, M.A.T., CCC-SLP, the principal, received the 2011 Tina E. Bangs Award by the Houston Association for Communication Disorders (HACD).

Curriculum
The school uses teachers, speech therapists, counselors, and music therapists. The employees assist children with speech education, reading education, social skills education, the act of paying attention, and auditory and language processing. The school has low student to teacher ratios.

School uniform
The Parish School requires its students to wear school uniforms.

All students must wear green or white polo shirts with the school's logo. All students may wear khaki trousers or shorts. In addition, girls may wear plaid skirts.

References

External links

 The Parish School

Private elementary schools in Texas
Private schools in Houston